Mauro Coppolaro (born 10 March 1997) is an Italian football player who played as centre-back for  club Modena.

Club career

Reggina
In 2014, Coppolaro was called up for Reggina first team. He made his league debut on 10 May 2014 against Brescia at Stadio Oreste Granillo which the match ended in a tie as 1-1. In this match, he played 7 minutes, after he was substituted for Daniel Adejo. He planted himself in the team by playing 5 games in a month.

Udinese
In August 2014, he moved to Udinese for an undisclosed fee. There he  played for two years with the Primavera team, in the youth under-19 national championship.

Latina (loan)
On 1 September 2016, Latina announced that Coppolaro was loaned to Latina until the end of 2016/17 Season. On 2 October 2016, he made professional debut for Latina against Cesena. He has played 6 games in a row.

Virtus Entella
In 2019 Coppolaro joined Virtus Entella.

Modena
On 6 August 2022, Coppolaro signed a two-year contract with Modena.

International career
Coppolaro has represented his country at various age groups. On 19 October 2013, he was first called up and played for Italy U17 against Ukraine U17.

With the Italy U19 he took part at the 2016 UEFA European Under-19 Championship, playing five games in the tournament, Italy finishing the competition as a runners-up.

Career statistics

References

1997 births
Living people
Sportspeople from Benevento
Footballers from Campania
Italian footballers
Association football defenders
Serie B players
Serie C players
Reggina 1914 players
Udinese Calcio players
Latina Calcio 1932 players
Brescia Calcio players
Venezia F.C. players
Virtus Entella players
Modena F.C. 2018 players
Italy youth international footballers